Kevin Ronald Bryant (born 8 July 1955) is a former Australian rules footballer who played with  in the Western Australian National Football League (WANFL) and North Melbourne in the Victorian Football League (VFL). He also represented Western Australia in State of Origin football.

Career
Bryant was the centre half-back in East Perth's 1978 WANFL premiership team and won their Best and Fairest award the same year.

He came to North Melbourne in 1979 and late in the season kicked three goals in their Qualifying Final win over Collingwood at the MCG. A utility, Bryant then returned to Perth to represent Western Australia at the Perth State of Origin Carnival.

Bryant later served as 's player match-up coordinator.

Personal life
Bryant is the father-in-law of former West Coast Eagles player Andrew Embley.

References

1955 births
North Melbourne Football Club players
East Perth Football Club players
Western Australian State of Origin players
Living people
Australian rules footballers from Perth, Western Australia